A taenia (Latin taenia; derived from the Ancient Greek ταινία (tainía): "band" or "ribbon") is a small "fillet" molding near the top of the architrave in a Doric column.

In classical architecture, the entire structure above the columns is called the entablature. It is commonly divided into the architrave, directly above the columns; the frieze, a strip with no horizontal molding, which is ornamented in all but the Tuscan order; and the cornice, the projecting and protective member at the top.

The architrave, the lowest band, is split from bottom to top into the broad fascia, the guttae or "drips" (below the triglyph in the frieze), and the taenia (below the projecting cymatium).

See also
 Classical order
 Roman architecture

Notes

References
 Image: Table of architecture, Cyclopaedia, 1728, volume 1

Columns and entablature
Ancient Roman architectural elements